Ian Carmichael (born 1 June 1960) is a Scottish sound engineer, born in Glasgow. He started his career working at the Irn Bru factory in Scotland before becoming a live sound engineer, before building his own recording studio called 'The Irn Bru Hit Factory' in Glasgow in 1986.   His most notable productions are for Glasgow indie band The Orchids, before he started his own band, One Dove, in 1991, with their highly influential album release, Morning Dove White in 1993. When One Dove split in 1995, Carmichael went on to work with Manchester band Lamb, with recording and mixing credits on both Fear of Fours and What Sound.  He also produced and remixed for iconic Glasgow indie band The Pastels on their albums Mobile Safari (1995), Illumination (1997), and Illuminati (1998), as well as Bis ("Detour" single), and Manchester garage band, Un-Cut. Currently, Carmichael teaches sound engineering and music production at SSR in Manchester, he has cited Irn Bru as his soft drink of choice during lectures and has recently reunited with The Orchids to remix tracks from their recent 2007 album, Good to Be a Stranger.

External links
 Morning Dove Web, an unofficial One Dove website
 
 
 , Ian's Homepage

Scottish audio engineers
Musicians from Glasgow
1960 births
Living people
Scottish record producers